The Yankton Treaty was a treaty signed in 1858 between the United States government and the Yankton Sioux (Nakota) Native American tribe, ceding most of eastern South Dakota (11 million acres) to the United States government. The treaty was signed in April 1858, and ratified by the United States Congress on February 16, 1859.  The agreement immediately opened this territory up for settlement by whites, resulting in the establishment of an unofficial local government not recognized by Washington.  The treaty also created the 430,000 acre Yankton Sioux Reservation, located in present-day Charles Mix County in South Dakota.

Smutty Bear (Ma-to-sa-be-che-a), a chief within the Yankton Sioux tribe, opposed the treaty because he thought it would only bring further white aggression as they assumed an authority over the land. Strike-the-Ree (Pa-le-ne-a-pa-pe, also known as "The Man that Struck the Ree"), the elder Yankton Sioux chief, also felt that too many whites were settling there, but decided that opposing them was futile, and he signed the treaty. Charles F. Picotte, a speculator, business venturist, and translator for these meetings was rewarded by the government with a 640-acre land grant in the newly incorporated territory, which would later become a major part of Yankton, South Dakota.

References

United States and Native American treaties
Pre-statehood history of South Dakota